Wilfried "Willi" Schneider (born 12 March 1963 in Mediaș, Transylvania) is a German skeleton racer who competed from 1992 to 2002. He won two medals in the men's skeleton event at the FIBT World Championships with a gold in 1998 and a bronze in 1999.

Schneider also finish ninth in the men's skeleton event at the 2002 Winter Olympics in Salt Lake City.

He won the men's overall Skeleton World Cup title in 1997-8.

After retiring from competition Schneider became a coach, leading the Canadian skeleton team to three medals at the 2006 Winter Olympics in Turin (a gold for Duff Gibson, a silver for Jeff Pain and a bronze for Melissa Hollingsworth), and coaching Jon Montgomery to victory in the 2010 Winter Olympics in Vancouver, British Columbia, Canada. In July 2012 Schneider agreed a two-year contract to coach the Russian skeleton team.

References

External links 
2002 men's skeleton results
List of men's skeleton World Cup champions since 1987.
Men's skeleton world championship medalists since 1989
Skeletonsport.com profile

1963 births
People from Mediaș
German male skeleton racers
Living people
Skeleton racers at the 2002 Winter Olympics
Olympic skeleton racers of Germany
German sports coaches
Romanian emigrants to Germany
21st-century German people
Coaches at the 2010 Winter Olympics
German expatriate sportspeople in Canada
German expatriate sportspeople in Russia